Kaori Takeyama (born 12 January 1972) is a Japanese snowboarder. She competed in the women's halfpipe event at the 1998 Winter Olympics.

References

1972 births
Living people
Japanese female snowboarders
Olympic snowboarders of Japan
Snowboarders at the 1998 Winter Olympics
Sportspeople from Hokkaido